= Emma Brunner-Traut =

Emma Brunner-Traut (Dec. 25, 1911, Frankfurt am Main - 18 Jan 2008, Tübingen) was a German Egyptologist, known for popularizing ancient Egyptian folk literature, for editing Heinrich Schäfer's Principles of Egyptian Art, and above all for her art historical concept of "aspective" (Aspektive). Aspective is the concept that Brunner-Traut developed to distinguish the characteristic classical Egyptian art style -- flat, non-dimensional -- from and in contrast to the "perspective" style of classical Greco-Roman and Renaissance style.

== Biography ==
Emma Traut was born in Frankfurt, Germany, in 1911. An aspiring classical pianist, her interests turned toward Egyptology, and she published a dissertation on ancient Egyptian dance in 1937. She married fellow Egyptologist Hellmut Brunner, doing fieldwork in Egypt in 1937–1938, and then took a position at the University of Tübingen, where she was closely related to its Egyptological collection.

Traut-Brunner published her influential work on "Aspektive" initially in 1963 in Heinreich Schäfer's Principles of Egyptian Art.

== Bibliography ==
- Brunner-Traut, Emma (1938). Der Tanz im Alten Ägypten nach bildlichen und inschriftlichen Zeugnissen. Ägyptologische Forschungen 6 (in German). Glückstadt: Augustin.
- Brunner-Traut, Emma (1956). Die altägyptischen Scherbenbilder (Bildostraka) der Deutschen Museen und Sammlungen (in German). Wiesbaden: Franz Steiner.
- Brunner-Traut, Emma (1963). Altägyptische Märchen (in German). Düsseldorf/Köln: Eugen Diederichs. (and numerous subsequent editions, through at least 8th edition 1989)
- Brunner-Traut, Emma (1968). Altägyptische Tiergeschichte und Fabel: Gestalt und Strahlkraft (in German). Darmstadt: Wissenschaftliche Buchgesellschaft.
- Brunner-Traut, Emma (1974). Die alten Ägypter: Verborgenes Leben unter den Pharaonen (in German). Stuttgart: W. Kohlhammer.
- Brunner-Traut, Emma (1977). Die altägyptische Grabkammer Seschemnofers III. aus Gîsa (in German). Mainz: Philipp von Zabern.
- Brunner-Traut, Emma; Brunner, Hellmut (1981). Die ägyptische Sammlung der Universität Tübingen (in German). Vol. 2 vols. Mainz: Philipp von Zabern.
- Brunner-Traut, Emma (1990). Frühformen des Erkennens: Aspektive im Alten Ägypten. Wissenschaftliche Buchgesellschaft, Darmstadt.
- Brunner-Traut, Emma (1982). Kleine Ägyptenkunde: Von den Pharaonen bis heute (in German) (4th 2000 ed.). Stuttgart: W. Kohlhammer.
- Brunner-Traut, Emma (1988). Gelebte Mythen: Beiträge zum altägyptischen Mythos (in German) (3rd ed.). Darmstadt: Wissenschaftliche Buchgesellschaft.
- Brunner-Traut, Emma (1998). Alltag unter den Pharaonen (in German). Freiburg: Herder.
- Brunner-Traut, Emma (2000). Die Kopten: Leben und Lehre der frühen Christen in Ägypten (in German). Freiburg: Herder.

As editor / her work in English

- Schäfer, Heinrich (1963). Brunner-Traut, Emma (ed.). Von ägyptischer Kunst: eine Grundlage (in German) (4th ed.). Wiesbaden: Otto Harrassowitz. (1963 publication included her first publication of the work on 'aspective', which was subsequently translated into English)
- Schäfer, Heinrich (1974). Brunner-Traut, Emma (ed.). Principles of Egyptian Art. Translated and edited with an introduction by John Baines; foreword by E. H. Gombrich. Oxford: Clarendon Press / Griffith Institute. ISBN 978-0-900416-51-4.
